Drakes Creek is a tributary of East Fork Harveys Creek in Luzerne County, Pennsylvania, in the United States. In 1974, the creek itself was described as having "excellent" water quality. The surficial geology in its watershed features Wisconsinan Till, Wisconsinan Ice-Contact Stratified Drift, and bedrock consisting of sandstone, conglomeratic sandstone, shale, and coal.

Course
Drakes Creek begins in the village of Chase, in Jackson Township. It flows west for a few tenths of a mile before turning southwest and flowing through a valley for more than a mile. The creek then turns south for a short distance before turning south-southwest. After several tenths of a mile, it reaches its confluence with East Fork Harveys Creek.

Hydrology
At river mile 0.51, the peak annual discharge of Drakes Creek has a 10 percent chance of reaching 260 cubic feet per second and a 2 percent chance of reaching 420 cubic feet per second. It has a 1 percent chance of reaching 510 cubic feet per second and a 0.2 percent chance of reaching 700 cubic feet per second.

Upstream of Pine Tree Road, the peak annual discharge of Drakes Creek has a 10 percent chance of reaching 200 cubic feet per second and a 2 percent chance of reaching 320 cubic feet per second. It has a 1 percent chance of reaching 380 cubic feet per second and a 0.2 percent chance of reaching 550 cubic feet per second.

Geography and geology

A mountain known as Larksville Mountain runs parallel to Drakes Creek on the creek's eastern side.

The surficial geology in the vicinity of Drakes Creek mostly features a glacial or resedimented till known as Wisconsinan Till and bedrock consisting of sandstone, conglomeratic sandstone, shale, and coal. However, there are also two patches of Wisconsinan Ice-Contact Stratified Drift, which consists of stratified sand and gravel and some boulders, in the vicinity of the creek. One patch is the creek's headwaters in the community of Chase.

Watershed
The stream is entirely within the United States Geological Survey quadrangle of Kingston.

History
Drakes Creek was entered into the Geographic Names Information System on August 2, 1979. Its identifier in the Geographic Names Information System is 1173453.

In a 1974 by the Pennsylvania Bureau of Water Quality Management, Drakes Creek was described as having "excellent" water quality.

See also
List of rivers of Pennsylvania

References

Rivers of Luzerne County, Pennsylvania
Tributaries of Harveys Creek
Rivers of Pennsylvania